Frostbite is a 1983 action game designed by Steve Cartwright for the Atari 2600, and published by Activision in 1983. Combining elements of Frogger and Q*bert in an arctic setting, the goal is to help Frostbite Bailey build igloos by jumping on ice floe. Thwarting this endeavor are clams, snow geese, Alaskan king crabs, polar bears, and the rapidly dropping temperature.

Gameplay

The bottom two thirds of the screen is water with four rows of ice blocks floating horizontally. The player moves by jumping from one row to another while avoiding foes. Landing on a row of white ice changes it to blue and adds a piece to the igloo on the shore. When all the ice is blue, it reverts to white. After 15 pieces, the igloo is complete, and the player must enter it to end the level.

The direction ice is flowing can be changed via the joystick button, but it costs a piece of an incomplete igloo.

Occasional fish can be collected for points.

Each level must be completed in 45 seconds (represented as the declining temperature). The faster a level is completed the more bonus points are awarded. Levels alternate between large ice blocks and little ice pieces. The large blocks have gaps that the player can fall in. Starting in the fourth level, a polar bear prowls the shore.

Activision patch
The game manual included a chance to become an Arctic Architect, by scoring 40,000 points or more. If the player took a photo of the TV screen showing the score and sent it to Activision, they would receive an Arctic Architects emblem.

References

External links
Frostbite at Atari Mania
Frostbite manual

1983 video games
Activision games
Atari 2600 games
Atari 2600-only games
Multiplayer video games
North America-exclusive video games
Video games designed by Steve Cartwright
Video games developed in the United States